Luis Alberto Arias (born 19 April 1991) is an Argentine professional footballer who plays as a defender.

Career
Arias played the early years of his senior career with Almirante Brown. He made his debut in a Primera B Nacional fixture on 10 June 2012 versus Guillermo Brown, taking the place of Diego Cisterna after eighty-five minutes. Arias didn't appear in the 2012–13 season, though returned in 2013–14 to make six appearances; five of which as a starter, as the club were relegated to Primera B Metropolitana. Arias left soon after, joining Vélez Sarsfield in Torneo Federal B. Twelve appearances followed as they won promotion to the 2015 Torneo Federal A. He left midway through that subsequent campaign to San Martín.

After stints with Atlético Camioneros and El Porvenir de San Clemente, where he scored his first two senior goals, Arias completed a return to Almirante Brown on 20 July 2018. His secondary debut came on 25 August in a 1–0 victory over Barracas Central.

Career statistics
.

References

External links

1991 births
Living people
People from La Matanza Partido
Argentine footballers
Association football defenders
Primera Nacional players
Primera B Metropolitana players
Club Almirante Brown footballers
Sportspeople from Buenos Aires Province